The Simhachala Hill Range, with the anglicised name Simhachalam Hills,  are a towering mountain range (377 m) in the city of Visakhapatnam, in Andhra Pradesh state, southern India. It is one of the hill ranges in Andhra Pradesh and in the Eastern Ghats.

Geography
The Simhachalam Hills form part of the eastern ranges of the Eastern Ghats system. These hills cover an area of 32 km.

History
The Simhachalm Hill Range has a lot of rich history. The famous Varaha Lakshmi Narasimha temple is located here. The Chalukya period Radha Madhava Swamy temple and some old Buddhist monuments are also found here.

Devotional
The hills house many temples including the Varaha Lakshmi Narasimha temple and other smaller ones; every year a festival is held called the Giri Pradakshina, where Hindu devotees walk 35km around the hill.

About
The neighborhoods of Visakhapatnam city situated near the hill range are Adavivaram, Akkayyapalem, Balayya Sastri Layout, Gopalapatnam, Hanumanthavaka, Kailasapuram, Madhavadhara, Narasimha Nagar, Prahaladapuram, andSeethammadhara.

Flora and fauna
Simhachalam Hills protected Visakhapatnam city environmental hazards and Andhra University has found 74 varieties of flora and 200 species.

References

Mountain ranges of India
visakhapatnam district
Eastern Ghats
South Deccan Plateau dry deciduous forests
Tourist attractions in Visakhapatnam
Geography of Visakhapatnam